Walter Fernando Pérez (born 31 January 1975 in San Justo) is an Olympic gold medal-winning racing cyclist from Argentina.

Pérez, who joined the Argentine cycling team in 1992, won the Cycling World Championships in 2004 and Men's Madison gold medal  at the 2008 Summer Olympics with teammate Juan Curuchet. Walter also won two gold medals at the Pan American Games (2003 in Santo Domingo and 2007 in Rio de Janeiro).

Walter carried the flag for his country at the opening ceremony of the 2011 Pan American Games in Guadalajara, México and 2015 Pan American Games in Toronto, Canada.

In 2008, he received the Gold Olimpia Award as the best athlete of the year from his country with Juan Curuchet; and in 2010 they won the Platinum Konex Award as the best cyclist of the last decade in Argentina.

References
"Curuchet y Pérez, dos luchadores con gloria" Crítica Digital

External links
 
 
 
 

1975 births
Living people
Argentine male cyclists
Argentine track cyclists
UCI Track Cycling World Champions (men)
Olympic cyclists of Argentina
Olympic gold medalists for Argentina
Olympic medalists in cycling
Cyclists at the 1996 Summer Olympics
Cyclists at the 2000 Summer Olympics
Cyclists at the 2004 Summer Olympics
Cyclists at the 2008 Summer Olympics
Cyclists at the 2012 Summer Olympics
Medalists at the 2008 Summer Olympics
Pan American Games gold medalists for Argentina
Pan American Games silver medalists for Argentina
Pan American Games bronze medalists for Argentina
Pan American Games medalists in cycling
Cyclists at the 1995 Pan American Games
Cyclists at the 1999 Pan American Games
Cyclists at the 2003 Pan American Games
Cyclists at the 2007 Pan American Games
Cyclists at the 2011 Pan American Games
Cyclists at the 2015 Pan American Games
Medalists at the 1995 Pan American Games
Medalists at the 2003 Pan American Games
Medalists at the 2007 Pan American Games
Medalists at the 2011 Pan American Games
Medalists at the 2015 Pan American Games
South American Games silver medalists for Argentina
South American Games bronze medalists for Argentina
South American Games medalists in cycling
Competitors at the 2010 South American Games
Cyclists from Buenos Aires